Nesar-e Sipeh (also Romanized as Nes̱ār-e Sīpeh) is a village in Hati Rural District, Hati District, Lali County, Khuzestan Province, Iran. At the 2006 census, its population was 73, in 11 families.

References 

Populated places in Lali County